"She's Gonna Make It" is a song co-written and recorded by American country music artist Garth Brooks.  It was released in January 1998 as the second single from his album Sevens.  It peaked at number two on the U.S. country singles chart, while it was a number-one country song in Canada.  The song was written by Brooks, Kent Blazy and Kim Williams.

Chart positions
"She's Gonna Make It" re-entered the chart as an official single at number 53 on the U.S. Billboard Hot Country Singles & Tracks for the week of January 17, 1998.

Year-end charts

References

1997 songs
Garth Brooks songs
1998 singles
Songs written by Kent Blazy
Songs written by Garth Brooks
Songs written by Kim Williams (songwriter)
Song recordings produced by Allen Reynolds
Capitol Records Nashville singles